Neodactylostomum is a genus of trematodes in the family Opecoelidae. It consists of one species, Neodactylostomum saipanense (Toman, 1992) Toman, 1996. Toman (1996) synonymised Neodactylostomum and N. saipanense with Paradactylostomum Zhukov, 1972 and P. saipanense Toman, 1992, respectively.

References

Opecoelidae
Plagiorchiida genera
Monotypic protostome genera